This article is a list of known military operations of the Vietnam War in 1973 and 1974, conducted by the armed forces of the Republic of Vietnam, the Khmer Republic, the United States and their allies.

See also
 List of allied military operations of the Vietnam War (1975)

References

External links
 HELICOPTER Operations in VIETNAM
 Special Operations in Vietnam
 Information About Records Relating to the Vietnam War Operations Analysis (OPSANAL) System

1973-74
Military operations involving the United States
Military operations involving Vietnam
Operations 1973
 
 
1973 in Vietnam
1974 in Vietnam